Victor Mayer Amédée Mannheim (17 July 1831 – 11 December 1906) was the inventor of the modern slide rule.  Around 1850, he introduced a new scale system that used a runner to perform calculations. This type of slide rule became known under the name of its inventor: the Mannheim.

References
 Computer Museum, Kiel

External links
 

1831 births
1906 deaths
19th-century French mathematicians
20th-century French mathematicians
French Jews
Jewish scientists